Laophontopsidae is a family of copepods belonging to the order Harpacticoida.

Genera:
 Aculeopsis Huys & Willems, 1989
 Laophontopsis Sars, 1908
 Telodocus Huys & Willems, 1989

References

Copepods